Marianne Skerrett (20 June 1793 – 29 July 1887) was a British courtier. She was a Dresser (lady's maid) to Queen Victoria between 1837 and 1862.

Biography
She was born in London to Walter Frye Skerrett and Albinia Mathias Skerrett. She was employed by the queen after her accession to the throne in 1837. She was the Principal Dresser and, as such, overranked and supervised the Second and Third Dresser and the Wardrobe Maids, all part of the Department of the Mistress of the Robes.

She was responsible for the organization of the queen's chamber staff, handling the contacts with tradespeople and artists, making orders and paying them and answering beggar letters. She was a personal friend of Queen Victoria and replaced Louise Lehzen as the queen's confidante when Lehzen left Britain in 1842. As such, she had an important position in the royal household, as the queen was generally closer to her chamber staff than to her ladies-in-waiting, to whom she normally had a less personal attitude.

Skerrett retired with a pension in 1862 and settled with her sister in London. She was replaced by Annie MacDonald (1832–1897).

Skerrett died on 29 July 1887, at the age of 94. Upon hearing of her former dresser's passing, Queen Victoria wrote in her journal:

References 

Queen Victoria
1793 births
1887 deaths
Women of the Victorian era
Court of Queen Victoria